Eupatorium tashiroi is a plant species in the family Asteraceae.

References

tashiroi
Plants described in 1904